Monument to veterinarians is a monument in Rostov-on-Don in Russian Federation.

Opening 

The monument was opened on September 24, 2014, in honor of the 225th anniversary of the veterinary service of the city, on the eve of an International Veterinary Congress. The opening ceremony was held despite the difficult weather conditions and hurricane wind.

Sculptor 

The monument was designed by the sculptor Dmitry Lindin, known for such works as: "Corobeinic", "Assol", and "Pervoklassnik".

Description 

The monument depicts a smiling bearded man, dressed in an apron, sitting on a simple bench. The doctor gently pets a foal that stands in front of him. The doctor himself is created in the image of Paramonov - a veterinarian who risked his life while treating horses during the war in the eighteenth century. The foal was chosen as an animal not by chance – it is a symbol of the Don and new life. On the shoulder of the vet located a bag of tools at the disposal of any farrier of the time. It also has a small hole for donations. The money collected in this way will go to charitable organizations.

Location and its role 

The monument is located away from the city center, on the street line 16, next to the house 18. In the same house lived a honored veterinarian of the Russian Federation – Sergey Ivanovich Baharov. For a long time, he headed the station for treatment of animals, gave official approval and helped in the introduction of various vaccines in the region.

References 

Tourist attractions in Rostov-on-Don
Statues in Russia
Monuments and memorials in Rostov-on-Don